Chua may refer to:

 Hokkien or Teochew Romanisation of Cai (surname)

People named Chua 
 Paul Chua, Singaporean bodybuilding official
 Leon O. Chua (born 1936), Philippines-born American electrical engineer
 Amy Chua (born 1962), American legal academic and author, daughter of Leon O. Chua
 Robert Chua, Singaporean television presenter
 Tanya Chua, Singaporean singer and songwriter
 Chau Jim Neo, Singaporean cookbook author
 Chua Tian Chang, Malaysian politician
 Chua Lam, columnist, food critic and television host in Hong Kong and Japan
 Chua Soi Lek, Malaysian politician
 Joi Chua, Singaporean singer
 Jonathan Chua, Singaporean musician & entrepreneur 
 Tony Chua, Filipino Chinese businessman
 Alfrancis Chua, Filipino professional basketball coach
 Chua Ek Kay, Singaporean artist
 Simon Chua Ling Fung, Singaporean bodybuilder
 Manuel Chua, Filipino male model, actor
 Mark Chua, Filipino student, killed for exposing irregularities in his university's Reserved Officers Training Corps Unit
 Chua Jui Meng, Malaysian politician
 Brent Chua, Chinese Filipino model
 Glen Chua, Canadian film director, actor, and writer
 Michael Chua, Singaporean film producer, director and poet
 Chua Tee Yong, Malaysian politician
 Chua Phung Kim (1939–1990), Singaporean weightlifter
 Chua Sock Koong (1956–), is the Group CEO of Singapore Telecommunication
 Chua Beng Huat, Singaporean academic
 Chua Soon Bui, Malaysian politician
 Dino Carlo Chua (1980–) is a Filipino politician
 Howard G. Chua-Eoan, News Director for Time magazine
 Chua Tze Jean (1987–), Malaysian professional golfer
 Chua En Lai (1979–), Singaporean comedian and actor
 Dexmon Chua, Singaporean murder victim
Jimmy Chua Hwa Soon, Singaporean murderer
Chua Ser Lien, Singaporean kidnapper

Places 
 Tủa Chùa District, Vietnam
 Chua Cuoi Stadium, multi-use stadium in Nam Dinh, Vietnam
 Chua Trong, or Perfume Pagoda, Vietnam
 Chua Bo De, Vietnamese Buddhist Temple in New Orleans, USA
 Chua Buu Mon, Buddhist Temple in Port Arthur, Texas, USA
 Chua Cocani, small town in Bolivia
 Chua Chu Kang, suburb in the West Region of Singapore

Other
 Chua's circuit, an electrical circuit invented by Leon O. Chua, that exhibits chaotic behaviour
 Canh chua, a type of Vietnamese soup
 Ba Chua Xu, southern Vietnamese prosperity goddess